Jurong Road is a small road near Tengah in western Singapore, linking Bukit Batok Road with a Heavy Vehicle Carpark nearby.

The oldest road in the Jurong area, it was first constructed between 1852 and 1853 during the early British colonial period to create a proper road link between the rural areas of Jurong and the rest of Singapore. Later, it was extended towards Bukit Timah Road in 1929. In the 1960s, Jurong Road's original span ran from Bukit Timah Road (directly in front of the former Bukit Timah Fire Station) to a dead end in Tuas (at the present-day junction of Tuas Road and Pioneer Road). The stretch of this roadway between Upper Bukit Timah Road and Jalan Jurong Kechil is now known as Old Jurong Road. Upper Jurong Road starts from the western end of Boon Lay Way and ends at Pasir Laba Flyover of the Pan Island Expressway (PIE), after which it continues briefly towards Pasir Laba Camp and the SAF Multi-Mission Range Complex (MMRC). Up till 26 September 2020, a short section of the original road (which still bears the historic Jurong Road name) connects Jurong West Avenue 2 and Bukit Batok Road, running roughly parallel to the PIE.

Smaller roads (mostly rural tracks formerly serving several villages (kampongs) scattered in the Tengah and Hong Kah localities) along the current Jurong Road spread out further into the largely-forested area of Tengah; these include Track 18, Track 20 and Track 22. Track 22 links to Jalan Chichau and Jalan Lam Sam (located along the southern edge of the Choa Chu Kang area). Both Jalan Chichau and Jalan Lam Sam has been removed from January 2019, and the remaining section were removed from 27 September 2020.

A large portion of Jurong Road was permanently closed from 27 September 2020, together with Track 18, Track 20 and Track 22, leaving only a short stretch between Bukit Batok Road and the entrance of the nearby Heavy Vehicle Carpark operational. This will help facilitate the construction of roads - Tengah Way, Tengah Boulevard, and Plantation Loop as well as neighbouring parks.

Roads in Singapore
Jurong East
Jurong West